Mitenskoye is a rural locality (a village) in Novlenskoye Rural Settlement, Vologodsky District, Vologda Oblast, Russia. The population was 5 as of 2002.

Geography 
The distance to Vologda is 73 km, to Novlenskoye is 13 km. Gridenskoye is the nearest rural locality.

References 

Rural localities in Vologodsky District